Adenike Grange is a former Nigerian Minister in charge of the Federal Ministry of Health.

Background

Adenike Grange attended high school in Lagos and then at St. Francis' College, Letchworth in the United Kingdom. From 1958 to 1964 she studied medicine at the University of St Andrews in Scotland. She worked in Dudley Road Hospital in Birmingham before returning to Nigeria in 1965, where she continued to work in hospitals in Lagos. She returned to the UK in 1967  
and became senior house officer (paediatrics) at the St Mary's Hospital for children, and obtained a Diploma in Child Health in 1969.
In 1971 she joined the Lagos University Teaching Hospital. In 1978 she became a lecturer at the College of Medicine, University of Lagos. She became a Senior Lecturer in 1981 and a Professor in 1995.

Adenike Grange acted as a consultant to the Federal Ministry of Health, WHO, UNICEF, UNFPA and USAID. She was WHO Adviser on the Reproductive Health Programme in Nigeria from 1993 to 1999. She is the author of over fifty scientific papers, mainly on diarrhoeal and nutritional conditions in children. She served as President of the International Paediatric Association.
In her long career, she became known as a strong voice in the fight to improve the health of children.

Minister of Health

On 25 July 2007, Adenike Grange was appointed the Minister of Health of the
Federal Republic of Nigeria, the first female Minister of Health.

On 9 November 2007, Professor Adenike Grange gave the Lancet Lecture at the UCL Centre for International Health & Development. She said "There is enough in terms of knowledge initiatives, strategies, tools, drugs and treatment protocols to cure disease and prolong life, but the reality is that the systems designed to bring about these outcomes are inadequate at best or even non-existent. This is a global problem." She described work in Nigeria to standardise approaches to health delivery and emulate best practice from other countries. Priorities included eradicating polio, controlling malaria, reducing maternal mortality, and reducing levels of disease in the most vulnerable groups.

In January 2008, at an event attended by the President's wife Turai Umar Musa Yar'Adua, Adenike Grange urged the first lady to draw national attention to the importance of the health related Millennium Development Goals. She called on the National Assembly to expedite passage of the national health bill, and called on the wives of State Governors to push for laws to promote the well-being of women and children.

Resignation and prosecution

In February 2008, Adenike Grange was arrested on the orders of President Umaru Yar'Adua over the handling of N300 million of unspent funds in the 2007 budget and award of contracts, and was examined by the Economic and Financial Crimes Commission (EFCC). She claimed that she had been misadvised by her directors.
The President had reportedly directed that all unspent money in the budget be returned, but it was allegedly shared by officials of the Health Ministry as bonuses.
In March 2008, President Yar'Adua accepted the resignation of Adenike Grange.

In March 2008, the Nigerian Medical Association (NEC) noted with deep regrets the developments that had culminated in the resignation of Adenike Grange. The NEC acknowledged the integrity, sincerity and commitment to duty of Adenike Grange, her contributions to the care of millions of Nigerian Children and her efforts in her short stay at the Federal Ministry of Health.

In April 2008, an Abuja high court ordered that she be remanded in the custody of the Economic and Financial Crimes Commission.  Senator Iyabo Obasanjo-Bello, daughter of former president Olusegun Obasanjo, was also charged but did not appear in court.

In December 2009, a Court of Appeal sitting in https://www.ipa-world.org/ , in a unanimous verdict, ordered that Professor Grange should not stand further trial. She was discharged from facing prosecution and all charges were quashed.

Life after resignation
Prof. Adenike Grange went back fully into her commitment to promote maternal and child health as she took up the challenge of heading one of Nigeria's best Pediatric Hospitals, Otunba Tunwase National Pediatric Centre which she helped establish and has since been handed over to the University College Hospital, Ibadan as a way of upgrading the standards of the hospital.
she introduced several development initiatives which has helped the hospital grow tremendously. one of the most prolific initiatives she introduced is the Local Health Insurance Scheme for the people of Ijebu Land who couldn't afford to pay for quality health and through this insurance scheme, several people in the community were able to access the services of the hospital.

She has since been very active through the Global Alliance for Vaccination and the e.

With the help of one of Nigeria's most famous Youth Activists and a youth development expert, Abayomi Mighty, she launched AdeGrange Child Foundation, an NGO committed to promoting the well-being of mothers and children through strategic advocacy programmes.

References

13.     

Living people
Yoruba women in politics
Yoruba women physicians
Nigerian pediatricians
Health ministers of Nigeria
Nigerian women medical doctors
People educated at St. Francis' College, Letchworth
Alumni of the University of St Andrews
Academic staff of the University of Lagos
Nigerian women academics
Yoruba women academics
Nigerian expatriates in the United Kingdom
20th-century Nigerian medical doctors
21st-century Nigerian medical doctors
Physicians from Lagos
Women government ministers of Nigeria
Year of birth missing (living people)
20th-century women physicians
21st-century women physicians
Yoruba women
Citizens of Nigeria through descent
Nigerian consultants